Juan Trigos (born February 26, 1965) is a Mexican composer and conductor who created the "Hemofiction Opera" genre.

Biography 
Juan Trigos was born in Mexico City, and studied music at the National Conservatory and the Instituto de Liturgia Música y Arte Cardinal Miranda. He continued his studies in Italy at the Pontificio Istituto di Musica Sacra of Rome, the Conservatorio di Musica G. Verdi (Milan), the Civica Scuola di Musica (Milan), and the Academy Lorenzo Perosi (Biella). Juan was taught by Franco Donatoni, Niccolò Castiglioni, Giovanni Bucci and Jesús Villaseñor (composition), Gianpiero Taverna, Franco Gallini, Domenico Bartolucci, and Xavier González Tescucano (conducting), Enzo Stanzani, Margot Fleites, and Miguel Agustín López (piano).

Bibliography 
Music Publisher PromoMusica International Ed.
Millan, Eduardo Soto, Diccionario de compositores Mexicanos de Música de Concierto, tomo II, Mexico, Sociedad de autores y Compositores de México/Fondo de Cultura Económica, 1998, pp. 301–302, 
Consuelo Carredano, Juan Trigos. Chronology, works's catalog and documentary references, «Pauta, cuadernos de teoria y crítica musical», June–September 2003, nn. 87–88, pgg. 133–156.

References 

https://web.archive.org/web/20081118201152/http://www.musiccentre.ca/apps/index.cfm?fuseaction=composer.FA_dsp_biography&authpeopleid=62373&by=T (Member of Canadian Music Centre)
https://web.archive.org/web/20110722225032/http://fonca.conaculta.gob.mx/ligas/beneficiarios/eca08.php (Members of Sistema Nacional de Creadores de Arte)
 DeCachetitoRaspado  https://www.youtube.com/watch?v=IBcJ5HGVx3Y (VIDEO)
 Mis Dos Cabezas piensan peor que una https://www.youtube.com/watch?v=AqJzNs3pfio (VIDEO)
 Donatoni, Hot https://www.youtube.com/watch?v=VH44_x4DJP0 (VIDEO as a Conductor)

Living people
1965 births
Mexican composers
Mexican male composers
Mexican conductors (music)
Male conductors (music)
21st-century American composers
American male composers
American male conductors (music)
American musicians of Mexican descent
21st-century American conductors (music)
21st-century American male musicians